Ion Prepurgel (12 April 1947 - 25 December 1990) was a Romanian football midfielder.

Honours
Progresul București
Divizia B: 1965–66
Argeș Pitești
Divizia A: 1971–72

References

External links
Ion Prepurgel at Labtof.ro

1947 births
1990 deaths
Romanian footballers
Association football midfielders
Liga I players
Liga II players
FC Argeș Pitești players
FC Progresul București players
AFC Dacia Unirea Brăila players